Ergül Avcı Eroğlu (born July 24, 1987 in Bursa, Turkey) is a Turkish volleyball player.

Career
On 13 August 2020, she signed a 1-year contract with the Galatasaray Women's Volleyball Team.

Awards

Clubs
 2008-09 Women's CEV Top Teams Cup -  3rd place, with Fenerbahçe Acıbadem
 2008-09 Aroma Women's Volleyball League -  Champion, with Fenerbahçe Acıbadem
 2008-09 Turkish Cup -  Runner-Up, with Fenerbahçe Acıbadem
 2010 FIVB World Club Championship -  Champion, with Fenerbahçe Acıbadem
 2010-11 CEV Champions League -  Bronze medal, with Fenerbahçe Acıbadem
 2010-11 Aroma Women's Volleyball League -  Champion, with Fenerbahçe Acıbadem
 2011-12 Aroma Women's Volleyball League -  Runner-Up, with Vakıfbank Spor Kulübü
 2012-13 Turkish Cup -  Champion, with Vakıfbank Spor Kulübü
 2012–13 CEV Champions League -  Champion, with Vakıfbank Spor Kulübü
 2012-13 Turkish Women's Volleyball League -  Champion, with Vakıfbank Spor Kulübü
 2014-15 Turkish Super Cup -  Champion, with Fenerbahçe Grundig
 2021–22 Turkish Super Cup -  Champion, with Fenerbahçe Beko

National
 2009 Women's European Volleyball League - 
 2013 Mediterranean Games -

References

External links
 Player profile at Galatasaray.org
 

1987 births
Living people
Turkish women's volleyball players
Galatasaray S.K. (women's volleyball) players
Fenerbahçe volleyballers
Yeşilyurt volleyballers
VakıfBank S.K. volleyballers
Eczacıbaşı volleyball players
Mediterranean Games medalists in volleyball
Mediterranean Games silver medalists for Turkey
Competitors at the 2013 Mediterranean Games
21st-century Turkish women